Tanner Novlan (born 9 April 1986) is a Canadian actor and model. He is best known for starring as "Struggling Actor" in a Liberty Mutual commercial (2019), as Gregory Manes on The CW's Roswell, New Mexico (2020–2021), and currently, for playing Dr. John "Finn" Finnegan in the American CBS soap opera The Bold and the Beautiful (2020–present).

Early life
Tanner Novlan was born on 9 April 1986 in Paradise Hill, Saskatchewan, to parents, Doug and Coresa Novlan. His mother is originated from Sacramento, California. His paternal grandfather, Clem, had an especially personal close bond with Novlan, as he was his first grandchild.  Novlan is the eldest of three siblings, with a younger sister and brother.

Novlan grew up on his family's farm, and at the age of twelve, he autonomously drove a $350,000 combine harvester. During his childhood, Novlan was very active in athletics, notably playing sports such as hockey, basketball and water-skiing. Upon his arrival in the United States at the age of 21, he worked for a construction company while simultaneously taking acting classes.

Career
Novlan made his feature film acting debut in the 2009 direct-to-video horror film Maneater and his television acting debut in the eighth episode of Season 6 of Bones. In 2013, he was selected to take part in the ABC Discovers: Los Angeles Talent Showcase and in 2016 starred in the independent feature film Flatbush Luck, which earned him award nominations for Best Actor at that year's FilmOut San Diego and the Hoboken International Film Festival. In addition, he has went on to appear in guest roles on many TV shows, most notably Parenthood, Letterkenny and Modern Family.

Novlan then created a name for himself when he played the part of the "Struggling Actor" on a commercial for Liberty Mutual. In March 2020, he was cast in the recurring role of Gregory Manes in The CW's Roswell, New Mexico, first appearing near the end of its second season. He reprised his role for the series' third season in 2021.

Entertainment Weekly exclusively reported that Novlan will star in a Hallmark Channel television film Christmas Class Reunion, opposite Aimee Teegarden. The film premiered on 10 December 2022.

As for his modeling career, Novlan was managed by the modeling agency Vision  (styled as VISION) and modeled in print campaigns for the brands Guess and Tommy Hilfiger.

The Bold and the Beautiful 

In July 2020, Novlan began playing the contract role of Dr. John Finnegan, on the CBS Daytime soap opera The Bold and the Beautiful. Novlan was said to have vacated the series in April 2022. Novlan's departure from the role, caused a major social media firestorm and uproar in which fans and critics alike responded negatively to the show's decision to write off Finn and had begun campaigning for the actor's return to the show, with several online petitions, the use of the hashtag #SaveFinn across various social media platforms, including Twitter, and expression of their devastation in soap opera sites' publications polls.

Novlan re-appeared on screen in late May in the series, where the viewers witnessed a shocking twist, where his character Finn was revealed to be alive, which meant the actor had never exited the series.  During a segment episode of  The Talk, Novlan discloses that he had been aware of Finn's resurrection, however, he was contractically obligated to keep this storyline arc underwraps.

Personal life
Novlan has stated that, once or twice a week, he plays hockey with a Los Angeles group informally called “Bad Boys Skate,” a collection of hockey enthusiasts.

In May 2015, Novlan got engaged to actress Kayla Ewell whom he met five years prior in 2010 on the set of the Australian band  Sick Puppies's music video "Maybe". The couple married on 12 September 2015. On 16 July 2019, Ewell gave birth to their daughter. On 6 June 2022, Ewell gave birth to their second child, a son.

Filmography

Film

Television

Music video

Awards and nominations

References

External links

1986 births
Living people
Canadian male film actors
Canadian male television actors
Canadian male soap opera actors
Canadian male models
21st-century Canadian male actors